Schuylkill County Bridge No. 114 (also known as Zimmerman's Covered Bridge) is a historic wooden covered bridge in Washington Township, Schuylkill County, Pennsylvania. It crosses Little Swatara Creek west of the village of Rock.

It was listed on the National Register of Historic Places in 1978.

References

Covered bridges on the National Register of Historic Places in Pennsylvania
Covered bridges in Schuylkill County, Pennsylvania
Bridges completed in 1875
Wooden bridges in Pennsylvania
National Register of Historic Places in Schuylkill County, Pennsylvania
Road bridges on the National Register of Historic Places in Pennsylvania
Burr Truss bridges in the United States